The Nokia Asha 300 is a cell phone which was first released in November 2011. Specifications include a 2.4-inch touch screen, 5 MP camera, Radio FM, MP3 support, a microSD memory card slot and a 24-day standby time, making it one of the leading phones on the market of its time for battery life.

See also
 Nokia Asha 302
 List of Nokia products
 Comparison of smartphones

References

External links
Nokia Developer device page for Asha 300
http://www.microsoft.com/en-gb/mobile/phone/300/specifications/

Nokia smartphones
Mobile phones introduced in 2011